The following is a list of notable deaths in April 2000.

Entries for each day are listed alphabetically by surname. A typical entry lists information in the following sequence:
 Name, age, country of citizenship at birth, subsequent country of citizenship (if applicable), reason for notability, cause of death (if known), and reference.

April 2000

1
Dorothy Freed, 81, New Zealand composer.
Alexander Mackenzie Stuart, Baron Mackenzie-Stuart, 75, British judge.
Herschel K. Mitchell, 86, American professor of biochemistry, stroke.
Willard J. Smith, 89, Commandant of US Coast Guard.

2
Fred Kwasi Apaloo, 79, Ghanaian judge.
Synnøve Anker Aurdal, 91, Norwegian textile artist.
Bunney Brooke, 80, Australian actress and casting director, (Round the Twist, Number 96, E Street), bowel and liver cancer.
Tommaso Buscetta, 71, Italian Mafia informant.
Greta Gynt, 83, Norwegian singer, dancer and actress.
Sir Robert Sainsbury, 93, British businessman and art benefactor.

3
Larry Finley, 86, American late-night broadcast pioneer.
Evelyn Irons, 99, Scottish journalist and war correspondent.
Ernesto Layaguin, hospital corpsman of the Philippine Marine Corps and posthumous recipient of the Medal of Valor.
Terence McKenna, 53, American ethnobotanist, mystic, psychonaut and author.
Laurence Narag Sr., Marine of the Philippine Marine Corps and posthumous recipient of the Medal of Valor.
David Treffry, 73, British colonial servant and financier.

4
Bridget Jones, 64, British literary academic.
Diamond Teeth Mary, 97, American singer and vaudeville entertainer.
Rolf Pingel, 86, German Luftwaffe flying ace and recipient of the Knight's Cross of the Iron Cross during World War II.
John W. Rollins, 84, American businessman and politician.
Carl L. Sitter, 77, US Marine Corps officer and Medal of Honor recipient.
William Stokoe, 80, American linguist.

5
Kanika Banerjee, 75, Indian singer.
Lee Petty, 86, American race car driver and member of the NASCAR Hall of Fame, abdominal aortic aneurysm.
Irina Sebrova, 85, Soviet Air Forces pilot and officer.
Derrick Walters, 67, British Anglican priest, Dean of Liverpool.
Chino 'Fats' Williams, 66, American actor.

6
Habib Bourguiba, 96, President of Tunisia.
Mohammad Ali Fardin, 69, Iranian actor and wrestler, cardiac arrest.
Azam Ghauri, Indian Islamist terrorist, killed in a police shoot out.
Don Johnson, 88, American baseball player.
William Stobbs, 85, British illustrator.
Richard Trice, 82, American blues guitarist, singer and songwriter.

7
Michael Bear, 66, British cricket player, heart failure.
Broery, 51, Indonesian singer, stroke.
Heinz Burt, 57, British German-born bassist and singer, stroke.
Moacir Barbosa Nascimento, 79, Brazilian football goalkeeper, heart attack.
Masayuki Minami, 58, Japanese Olympic volleyball player.
Walter Vickery, 90, Welsh rugby player.

8
Alfredo Alcala, 74, Filipino comics artist, cancer.
Bernie Grant, 56, British politician, heart attack.
Claire Trevor, 90, American actress, respiratory failure.
Bernie Witucki, 89, American football player and coach.

9
Alan Betrock, American music publisher, author and record producer, cancer.
Tony Cliff, 82, British Trotskyist writer and journalist.
Catherine Crook de Camp, 92, American science fiction and fantasy author.
Pablo Pineda Gaucín, Mexican crime reporter and photographer, shot execution-style.
Robert Komer, 78, American staff member during the Vietnam War.
W. Bruce Lincoln, 61, American scholar and author.
James William Malone, 80, American prelate of the Catholic Church.
William McHardy, 88, Scottish biblical scholar.

10
John Fforde, 78, British economist.
Arnold Johnson, 78, American actor.
Peter Jones, 79, British actor.
Larry Linville, 60, American actor (''[[M.
Olappamanna, 77, Indian poet, heart attack.
Aleksandr Sergeyevich Trofimov, 73, Soviet/Russian painter, art critic, and art historian.

11
Diana Darvey, 54, English actress, singer and dancer, fall.
André Deutsch, 82, Hungarian-born British publisher.
Dewayne Douglas, 68, American football player and coach.
Lucia Dlugoszewski, 74, Polish-American composer, poet, performer, and inventor.
Doris Marie Leeper, 71, American sculptor and painter.
Opaline Deveraux Wadkins, 88, first African American nurse to earn a master's degree.

12
Giles Shaw, 68, British politician, stroke.
Niaz Ahmed, 54, Pakistani cricketer.
David Crighton, 57, British mathematician and physicist.
Carmen Dillon, 91, English film art director and production designer.
Ronald Lockley, 96, Welsh ornithologist and naturalist.
Gerald Francis O'Keefe, 82, American bishop of the Catholic Church, heart attack.
Christopher Pettiet, 24, American actor, drug overdose
Giles Shaw, 68, British politician, stroke.
James Vorenberg, 72, professor of Law and Dean of Harvard Law School, heart attack.

13
Giorgio Bassani, 84, Italian writer.
Frenchy Bordagaray, 90, American baseball player.
Aivars Gipslis, 63, Latvian chess grandmaster.
Marlene Goldsmith, 57, Australian politician, cancer.
Inglis Gundry, 94, English composer, novelist, and musicologist.
Albert Turner, 64, American civil rights activist, abdominal bleeding.

14
Bob Barthelson, 75, American baseball player.
Sir Humphrey Cripps, British businessman and philanthropist.
Sebastián Fleitas, 53, Paraguay football player, stroke.
Don Gullick, 75, Welsh rugby player.
Phil Katz, 37, American computer programmer (Zip file format).
August R. Lindt, 94, Swiss lawyer and diplomat.
Wilf Mannion, 81, English professional footballer.
Charlie O'Rourke, 82, American football player and coach.
Andrei Sârbu, 49, Moldovan painter.
George E. Taylor, 94, American sinologist.

15
Edward Gorey, 75, American writer and illustrator.
Irina Gubanova, 60, Russian ballerina and film actress.
Zeeshan Haider Jawadi, 61, Indian Islamic scholar and religious leader.
Hayati Hamzaoğlu, 67, Turkish actor.
Ba Kyi, 87, Burmese artist.
Todd Webb, 94, American photographer.

16
Henry Daniels, 87, British statistician.
Putra of Perlis, 79, third Yang di-Pertuan Agong of Malaya.
Sherwood Washburn, 88, American physical anthropologist.
Ann Mui, 40, Hong Kong singer and sister of Anita Mui

17
Wirantha Fernando, 41, Sri Lankan cricketer and politician, murdered by a mob.
Pyotr Glebov, 85, Russian actor.
Alice Marriott, 92, American philanthropist.
Paula Salomon-Lindberg, 102, German classical contralto.
Megan Williams, 43, Australian actress and singer, breast cancer.

18
Isaac Berenblum, 96, Polish-born Israeli biochemist.
Sachay Bhai, Indian poet and hymner.
Russell Jump, 105, American politician, Mayor of Wichita.
Candace Newmaker, 10, victim of child abuse, suffocation.
Jim Taylor, 68, Australian rules footballer.

19
Louis Applebaum, 82, Canadian film score composer, administrator, and conductor.
Robert Glen Coe, 44, American criminal, execution by lethal injection.
Masakazu Fukuda, 27, professional wrestler, brain hemorrhage.
Kyung-Chik Han, 97, Korean pastor.
Grigor Khanjyan, 73, Soviet-Armenian artist, painter, and illustrator.
Michael, 27, first male 'talking' gorilla.

20
Bill Dean, 78, British actor.
Willy Harlander, 68, German actor.
Philip Childs Keenan, 92, American astronomer.
Pratap Save, 54, Indian Army officer and a social activist, police brutality.

21
Ray H. French, 80, American artist.
Gunther Gerzso, 84, Mexican painter and screenwriter.
Al Purdy, 81, Canadian poet.
Nigar Sultana, 67, Indian actress.

22
Jack Best, 87, British RAF pilot, attempted escapee from Colditz.
Alexander H. Cohen, 79, American theatrical producer.
Arnt Eliassen, 84, Norwegian meteorologist.
Toon Hermans, 83, Dutch comedian, singer and writer.
Robert W. Porter Jr., 91, United States Army general, died on April 22, 2000, at the Martha Jefferson Hospital in Charlottesville, Virginia after a heart attack.
P. Indra Reddy, 45, Telugu politician, traffic accident.
Margaret Singana, 62, South African musician.
Jane Trahey, 76, American businesswoman and writer.

23
Erle Cocke Jr., 74, American businessman and war veteran, pancreatic cancer.
Anna-Liisa Hirviluoto, 71, Finnish archaeologist.
Shigeru Sugiura, 92, Japanese manga artist.
Sir David Thorne, 66, British army general.

24
Derek Allhusen, 86, British Olympic equestrian.
Chic Brodie, 63, Scottish footballer, prostate cancer.
Ulla Isaksson, 83, Swedish author and screenplay writer.
William Moore, 84, English character actor.
Karamana Janardanan Nair, 63, Indian film actor, stroke.
Barkin' Bill Smith, 71, American blues singer and songwriter, pancreatic cancer.
George Volkoff, 86, Russian-Canadian physicist and academic.

25
Ghislaine Alexander, 78, British heiress and socialite.
Niels Viggo Bentzon, 80, Danish composer and pianist.
Lucien Le Cam, 75, French mathematician.
Ben Fernandez, 75, American politician and financial consultant.
David Merrick, 88, American stage producer.
Edna Scheer, 73, All-American Girls Professional Baseball League player.
Mukhram Sharma, 90, Indian film lyricist, script, and story writer.

26
Gregory Gillespie, 63, American magic realist painter, suicide by hanging.
Len Smith, 82, Australian rugby player.
Herbert Wechsler, 90, American legal scholar.

27
C. R. Boxer, 96, British historian.
André Desjardins, 69, Canadian trade unionista and mobster, murdered.
Clifford Forsythe, 70, Northern Irish Ulster Unionist Party politician.
Brooks Lawrence, 75, American baseball player.
Errett Weir McDiarmid, 90, American librarian and academic.
Yusof Rawa, 76, Malaysian politician, pneumonia.
Vicki Sue Robinson, 45, American singer ("Turn the Beat Around") and actress, cancer.

28
Adriano Bausola, 69, Italian philosopher.
Richard Bertram, 84, American racing yacht and boat builder.
Jerzy Einhorn, 74, Polish-born Swedish medical doctor, researcher and politician.
Penelope Fitzgerald, 83, British writer.
Sergey Khristianovich, 91, Soviet/Russian mechanics scientist.
Jack Merson, 78, American baseball player.
Charles L. Southward, 87, United States Army Major General.

29
Ke T'ing-sui, 86, Chinese scientist.
Ireneusz Sekuła, 57, Polish politician, suicide.
Harriet Lange Rheingold, 92, American child development psychologist.
Antonio Buero Vallejo, 83, Spanish playwright, stroke.
Phạm Văn Đồng, 94, Prime Minister of Vietnam.
Buck Varner, 69, American baseball player.

30
Domingo Deluana, Philippine Marine Corps marine and posthumous recipient of the Medal of Valor, K.I.A.
Poul Hartling, 85, Prime Minister of Denmark (1973–1975).
Jonah Jones, 90, American jazz trumpeter.
Marjorie Noël, 54, French pop singer, cerebral hemorrhage.
Gwen Rix, 82, New Zealand diver.
Lolinato To-ong, Philippine Marine Corps officer and posthumous recipient of the Medal of Valor, K.I.A.

References 

2000-04
 04